Tarucus sybaris, the dotted blue, is a butterfly of the family Lycaenidae. It is found in southern Africa.

The wingspan is 22–26 mm for males and 20–27 mm for females. Adults are on wing year-round, with a peak from November to March.

The larvae feed on Ziziphus species, including Z. zeyheriana and Z. mucronata.

Subspecies
Tarucus sybaris sybaris – South Africa (East Cape, KwaZulu-Natal, eastern Orange Free State, Gauteng, Mpumalanga, Limpopo Province and North West Province), Mozambique, Zimbabwe, Zambia, Malawi
Tarucus sybaris linearis (Aurivillius, 1924) – North Cape, western Orange Free State, Namibia, Angola, Botswana

References

Butterflies described in 1855
Tarucus